
Gmina Czchów is an urban-rural gmina (administrative district) in Brzesko County, Lesser Poland Voivodeship, in southern Poland.

The gmina contains part of the protected area called Ciężkowice-Rożnów Landscape Park.

Villages
Apart from the town of Czchów, Gmina Czchów contains the villages and settlements of Będzieszyna, Biskupice Melsztyńskie, Domosławice, Jurków, Piaski-Drużków, Tworkowa, Tymowa, Wytrzyszczka and Złota.

Neighbouring gminas
Gmina Czchów is bordered by the gminas of Dębno, Gnojnik, Gródek nad Dunajcem, Iwkowa, Lipnica Murowana, Łososina Dolna and Zakliczyn.

External links
Polish official population figures 2006

Czchow
Brzesko County